Busey v. District of Columbia, 319 U.S. 579 (1943), was a case in which the Supreme Court of the United States overturned the conviction of a Jehovah's Witness for unlicensed selling of magazines on public sidewalks.

See also
List of United States Supreme Court cases, volume 319
Jones v. Opelika
Murdock v. Pennsylvania

References

Further reading

External links
 
 

1943 in United States case law
United States Supreme Court cases
Jehovah's Witnesses litigation in the United States
United States free exercise of religion case law
United States First Amendment case law
1943 in religion
United States Supreme Court cases of the Stone Court
Christianity and law in the 20th century